Caroline Dhenin (born 13 June 1973) is a French professional tennis player. Dhenin made the doubles semifinals twice at two tournaments—Antwerp and Strasbourg—and is a former finalist in Canberra on the WTA tour.

WTA career finals

Doubles (0–2)

ITF finals

Singles (2-0)

Doubles (12-13)

External links
 
 

1973 births
French female tennis players
Living people
Place of birth missing (living people)